Gharkun (also known as Charkun) is a mountain peak located at  above sea level in the west of the Saltoro Mountains, part of Karakorum Range.

Location 
The peak is located north west of La Yongma Ri and south-east of Dansam. The Line of Control runs across the summit. Its northern flank is drained via the Gyong Glacier while the southern flank is drained via the Chulung Glacier. On the opposite side of Gyong Glacier, in an east-northeast direction, rises 6727m high Gyong Kangri at a distance of 11 km.

Climbing history 
In July 1976, a group of five Japanese climbers (expedition leader Haruki Sugiyama) reached the summit.

References 

Mountains of the Karakoram
Wikipedia requested photographs by location